Phil Ohman (October 7, 1896 – August 8, 1954) was an American film composer and pianist. He is most well known for his collaboration with fellow musician Victor Arden.

Biography
Ohman was born Fillmore Wellington Ohman in New Britain, Connecticut in 1896.  He is remembered as being one half of one of the pre-eminent piano duos in the 1922-1932, paired with Victor Arden.  They were the pit pianists in many of George Gershwin's musicals, and recorded hundreds of piano rolls and records.  Starting in mid 1927, just as they signed to Victor Records, they developed a large studio orchestra specializing in Broadway show songs that became quite popular.  These particular records employed a rather large, brassy powerful sound (it is not known who they used as arranger), always with a space for a twin piano duet section.

Ohman died in Santa Monica, California on August 8, 1954.

Partial filmography
Try and Play It (1922)
Up and Down the Keys (1922)
Piano Pan (1922)
Sparkles (1935)
The Renegade Trail (1939)
Captain Caution (1940) 
The Roundup (1941) 
 Sweethearts of the U.S.A. (1944)
Dick Tracy vs. Cueball (1946) 
Million Dollar Weekend (1948)

See also
List of ragtime composers

References

Further reading

External links

 Phil Ohman recordings at the Discography of American Historical Recordings.

1896 births
1954 deaths
20th-century American composers
American film score composers
American pop pianists
American male pianists
American male film score composers
Ragtime composers
Ragtime pianists
20th-century American pianists
20th-century American male musicians